Tanrıqulular (also, Tangulular, Tanrygullar, Tanrygulular, and Tanrykulular) is a village and municipality in the Yevlakh Rayon of Azerbaijan.  It has a population of 2,426.

References 

Populated places in Yevlakh District